Lumley v Wagner [1852] EWHC (Ch) J96 is an English contract law case, concerning the right to terminate performance of a contract.

Facts
Mlle Johanna Wagner was engaged by Benjamin Lumley to sing exclusively at Her Majesty's Theatre on Haymarket from 1 April 1852 for 3 months, two nights a week. Frederick Gye, who ran Covent Garden Theatre, offered her more money to break her contract with Mr Lumley and sing for him.

Sir James Parker granted an injunction to restrain Mlle Wagner. She appealed.

Judgment
Lord St Leonards LC, in the Court of Chancery, held the injunction did not constitute indirect specific performance of Wagner's obligation to sing. So an order could be granted that prohibited Mlle Wagner from performing further other than at Her Majesty's Theatre.

See also

English contract law
Lumley v Gye
Bettini v Gye
Involuntary servitude

Notes

References

English contract case law
1852 in case law
1852 in British law
Court of Chancery cases